Seawell is a surname. Notable people with the surname include:

 Aaron A. F. Seawell (1864–1950), North Carolina politician and jurist
 Buie Seawell (born 1937), professor at the University of Denver, attorney, and former Colorado Democratic Party figure
 Donald Seawell (1912-2015), attorney and federal official from North Carolina
 Herbert F. Seawell (1869–1949), North Carolina lawyer and politician
 Molly Elliot Seawell (1860–1916), American writer
 Samuel Seawell (fl. 1700), lawyer and printer in Massachusetts
 Wallace Seawell (1916–2007), photographer best known for his portraits of Hollywood stars
 William Seawell (1918-2005), Brigadier General in the United States Air Force

See also
 Grantley Adams International Airport, formerly named Seawell Airport
 Justice Seawell (disambiguation)